'69 Newport is a 7" vinyl EP record by the influential ska-core band Operation Ivy. The 7" was composed of "Hedgecore" and "Left Behind", both of which were recorded at 924 Gilman Street in 1987. '69 Newport was unofficially released in March 1993 under the label Very Small Records. 5,029 were initially pressed on black vinyl. The song "Hedgecore" is a song about the local pastime in Berkeley which involves diving into and destroying bushes.

Track listing

Side A
"Hedgecore" – 1:43

Side B
"Left Behind" – 2:26

Personnel
 Jesse Michaels – vocals
 Lint – guitar, backing vocals
 Matt McCall – bass, backing vocals
 Dave Mello – drums
 David Hayes – Backing Vocals

External links
 '69 Newport @ Discogs.com

1993 EPs